Kolos is a rural locality (a passing loop) in Novoalexandrovsky Selsoviet, Rubtsovsky District, Altai Krai, Russia. The population was 60 as of 2013. There is 1 street.

Geography 
Kolos is located 14 km south of Rubtsovsk (the district's administrative centre) by road. Kolos (settlement) is the nearest rural locality.

References 

Rural localities in Rubtsovsky District